Emma Lindqvist (born 17 September 1997) is a Swedish handball player for Herning-Ikast Håndbold and the Swedish national team.

She represented Sweden at the 2019 World Women's Handball Championship.

Achievements 
Swedish Elitserien:
Winner: 2017
EHF Challenge Cup:
Finalist: 2017

References

External links

1997 births
Living people
Sportspeople from Helsingborg
Swedish female handball players
Handball players at the 2014 Summer Youth Olympics
Handball players at the 2020 Summer Olympics
Olympic handball players of Sweden
21st-century Swedish women